Diego is a Spanish male name.

Diego may also refer to:

People 
 Diego (given name), including a list of people with the given name
 Diego (surname), including a list of people with the surname

Music and entertainment 
 Go, Diego, Go!, a US children's television show
 Diego (band), an indie rock band from Germany
 Diego (Ice Age), a Smilodon from the children's animated movie franchise Ice Age
 Diego (album), a 2005 album by Diego Boneta

Other 
 DIEGO (furniture store), a Hungary-based retail furniture chain
 Diego (grape) or Vigiriega, a Spanish grape
 Diego (tortoise), a Hood Island giant tortoise
 Diego antigen system, a system of blood groups
 Diego's Hair Salon, in Washington, D.C.
 Winter Storm Diego, a December 2018 storm in the United States

See also
 San Diego (disambiguation)

ca:Dídac